The Agent Open Service Interface Definition (OSID) is an O.K.I. specification which supports the creation, retrieval and deletion of Agent and Groups.  OSIDs use Agents to represent individuals or processes that invoke various services. 

OSIDs are programmatic interfaces which comprise a service-oriented architecture for designing and building reusable and interoperable software.

Software architecture